The General Assault Badge was a military decoration awarded during World War II to personnel of the German Army, Waffen-SS and Ordnungspolizei (order police) who supported an infantry attack but were not part of specific infantry units and therefore did not qualify for the Infantry Assault Badge. It was instituted by General Walther von Brauchitsch on 1 June 1940.

Design
A wreath of five oak leaves runs around the circumference on each side of the medal with a pair of acorns at the base. Inside the wreath is a large Wehrmacht-style eagle with folded wings grasping a swastika which itself surmounts a crossed bayonet and stick grenade. The medal was held in place on the uniform with a pin and catch, and was worn on the left chest pocket.

From 22 June 1943, further classes were created, these bearing a small plate at the base with either 25, 50, 75 or 100 to recognise those soldiers who had taken part in numerous attacks. These were known as grades II through V, accordingly. Further the wreath was gold in color. Only one badge, the highest level received, was worn.

Nazi-era awards were initially banned by the post-war Federal Republic of Germany. In 1957 many World War II military decorations, including the General Assault Badge, were reauthorised for wear by qualifying veterans. With display of Nazi symbols banned, the badge was re-designed by removing the swastika, with members of the Bundeswehr wearing the badge on the ribbon bar, represented by a small replica of the award on a field grey ribbon.

Criteria for award
The medal was originally designed for presentation to combat engineers, as well as members of the artillery, anti-aircraft and anti-tank who supported infantry units in combat. It could also be awarded to medical personnel attending to battlefield casualties in "close combat conditions". Prior to the introduction of the Tank Destruction Badge in March 1942, the General Assault Badge could be conferred for the single-handed destruction of tanks or armoured vehicles.

Other determining factors for award:
 Ineligibility for the Infantry Assault Badge
 Participation in three infantry or armored attacks on three different days; or
 Participation in three infantry or armored indirect assaults on three different days.

Notes

References

1940 establishments in Germany
Awards established in 1940
Military awards and decorations of Nazi Germany